Bardet is a French surname. Notable people with the surname include:

Anne-Lise Bardet (born 1969), French slalom canoeist
Gaston Bardet (1907–1989), French architect
Georges Bardet (1885–?), French physician
Jean Bardet (born 1941), French politician
Roger Bardet, French resistance operative
Roland Bardet, Swiss slalom canoeist
Romain Bardet (born 1990), French racing cyclist

French-language surnames